The Khortytsia operational-strategic group is a formation of the Ukrainian Ground Forces in Ukraine active in the 2022 Russian invasion of Ukraine. The Khortytsia operational-strategic group is led by Colonel General Oleksandr Syrskyi, who also serves as the Commander of the Ground Forces of the Armed Forces of Ukraine. On January 19, Colonel General Syrskyi was part of a staff meeting alongside numerous commanders and important government leaders alongside President of Ukraine Volodymyr Zelenskyy. President Zelenskyy noted in the meeting that the Khortytsia group was deployed in the "hottest" part of the front line.

History 
On August 11, 2022, Colonel General Oleksandr Syrskyi of the Khortytsia Operational Strategic Group of Troops enacted a special exit and entry permit for the Donetsk Oblast. The operational-strategic group participated in the 2022 Kharkiv counteroffensive in the Kharkiv and Luhansk Oblasts in September.

On December 16, the Office of President Zelenskyy made a press release regarding a meeting with a group of United States military veterans, who handed over equipment and humanitarian aid to the Armed Forces of Ukraine. The president's office stated that the equipment, including vehicles, would be provided to the Tavria operational-strategic group and the Khortytsia operational-strategic group. By January 19, the operational-strategic group was, according to President Zelenskyy, deployed in the "hottest" part of the front line.

References 

Military units and formations of Ukraine
Khortytsia